Benhard Estate is a settlement in Kenya's Nairobi Area.

References 

Populated places in Nairobi Province